Harrison Township is one of thirteen townships in Owen County, Indiana, United States. As of the 2010 census, its population was 444, and it contained 208 housing units.

History
Harrison Township was organized in 1837.

Geography

Unincorporated towns
 Alaska at 
 Lewisville at

Cemeteries
The township contains Asher Cemetery.

Airports and landing strips
 Shenandoah Flying Field Airport

School districts
 Spencer-Owen Community Schools

Political districts
 State House District 47
 State Senate District 37

References
 
 United States Census Bureau 2009 TIGER/Line Shapefiles
 IndianaMap

External links
 Indiana Township Association
 United Township Association of Indiana
 City-Data.com page for Harrison Township

Townships in Owen County, Indiana
Townships in Indiana